This article contains information about the literary events and publications of 1783.

Events
April 14 – Gotthold Ephraim Lessing's drama Nathan der Weise receives its first professional performance, in Berlin.
May 6 – William Cobbett arrives in London to work, and later in the year joins the 54th (West Norfolk) Regiment of Foot.
September – Friedrich Schiller, having left Stuttgart for Weimar to avoid persecution, becomes resident dramatist at Mannheim.
November 18 – August von Kotzebue leaves St Petersburg to take up a position with the high court of appeal in Reval, then subject to the Russian Empire.

New books

Fiction
Rhijnvis Feith – Julia
Thomas Holcroft – The Family Picture
Sophia Lee – The Recess
Johann Karl August Musäus – Volksmärchen der Deutschen (second volume)
Clara Reeve – The Two Mentors

Children
Thomas Day (anonymously) – The History of Sandford and Merton (first of three story books)
Ellenor Fenn (as Mrs. Teachwell) – Cobwebs to Catch FliesDorothy Kilner (as M. P.) – The Life and Perambulation of a MouseMary Ann KilnerA Course of Lectures for Sunday Evenings. Containing religious advice to young persons(as S. S.) The Adventures of a PincushionDrama
Vittorio Alfieri – AgamennoneFrances Brooke – RoxinaHannah Cowley – Which is the Man?Richard Cumberland – The Mysterious HusbandJohn O'Keeffe – The Poor Soldier William Jackson – The Metamorphosis Samuel Jackson Pratt – The School for VanityPoetry

Lady Anne Barnard – Auld Robin Gray (ballad) (published anonymously)
William Blake – Poetical SketchesJudith Cowper – The Progress of PoetryGeorge Crabbe – The VillageJoseph Ritson – A Select Collection of English SongsJohn Wolcot (as Peter Pindar) – More Lyric Odes, to the Royal AcademiciansSee also 1783 in poetryNon-fiction
James Beattie – Dissertations Moral and CriticalWilliam Beckford – Dreams, Waking Thoughts and IncidentsHugh Blair – Lectures on Rhetoric and Belles LettresEdmund Burke – Letter on the Penal Laws Against Irish CatholicsAdam Ferguson – History of the Progress and Termination of the Roman RepublicWilliam Godwin – Life of Lord ChathamImmanuel Kant – Prolegomena to Any Future Metaphysics That Will Be Able to Present Itself as a ScienceVicesimus Knox – Elegant ExtractsMémoires secrets (anonymous)
Moses Mendelssohn – JerusalemEzra Stiles – The United States elevated to Glory and HonorHorace-Bénédict de Saussure – Essai sur l'hygrométrie''

Births
January 23 – Stendhal (Marie-Henri Beyle), French novelist (died 1842)
April 3 – Washington Irving, American short story writer, essayist and politician (died 1859)
May 14 – Samuel Lee, English orientalist and linguist (died 1852)
September 23 – Jane Taylor, English poet and novelist (died 1824)
December 10 – María Bibiana Benítez, Puerto Rican poet and playwright (died c. 1873)

Deaths
January 2 – Johann Jakob Bodmer, Swiss journalist and critic writing in German (born 1698)
April 17 – Louise d'Epinay French writer and salon hostess (born 1726)
September 6 – Anna Williams, Welsh-born poet (born 1706)
October 10 – Henry Brooke, Irish novelist, playwright, and poet (born 1703)
October 29 – Jean le Rond d'Alembert, French mathematician and philosopher (born 1717)
November 3 – Charles Collé, French dramatist and songwriter (born 1709)
November 23 – Ann Eliza Bleecker, American poet, novelist and letter writer (born 1752)

References

 
Years of the 18th century in literature